Osvaldo Fabián Nicolás "Nico" Gaitán (born 23 February 1988) is an Argentine professional footballer who plays as an attacking midfielder for Portuguese Primeira Liga club Paços de Ferreira.

A product of Boca Juniors, he joined Benfica in Portugal, where he won three Primeira Liga titles, one Taça de Portugal, five Taça da Liga and one Supertaça Cândido de Oliveira in six seasons.

Club career

Boca Juniors
Born in San Martín, Buenos Aires, Gaitán rose from the ranks at Boca Juniors, having entered its youth system at the age of 13 in spite of doubts regarding his future due to his small frame. He made his competitive debut with the club on 1 June 2008 in a 3–1 win against Arsenal de Sarandí, and scored his first two Primera División goals two months later in a 3–0 success at Huracán.

On 23 September 2008 Gaitán netted his first goal in an international tournament, that year's Copa Sudamericana, against Liga de Quito. Two days later he again made the scoresheet, in the 4–2 win over Newell's Old Boys where he also set up Lucas Viatri for his side's final goal.

Gaitán scored seven times in 33 games in his last season with Boca, who only managed to finish 11th in the Apertura and 16th in the Clausura.

Benfica
On 3 May 2010, Portugal's Benfica confirmed they had reached an agreement to sign Gaitán for €8.4 million, as a replacement for countryman Ángel Di María who had just been sold to Real Madrid. He made his official debut for his new team by starting and playing 66 minutes in a 1–2 away loss to Nacional, opening his scoring account also with a brace, at home against Naval on 14 November (4–0).

Gaitán finished his first year with the Lisbon side with 48 appearances all competitions comprised, scoring nine times as it finished second in the league and won the domestic league cup. For his performances, he was named Portuguese League Breakthrough Player of the Year.

In the 2011–12 campaign Gaitán led the UEFA Champions League assists table, until the knockout stage. In 2013–14 he contributed with eight goals overall as his team conquered the treble, including the game's only goal in the Portuguese Cup's decisive match against Rio Ave on 18 May 2014; His performances were praised throughout the season. On 31 August 2014, Gaitán scored his first goal of the season against Sporting CP, while also being named 'Man of the Match'.

On 11 November 2014, he extended his contract with Benfica until 30 June 2018 and set a release clause of €35 million. On 30 September 2015, Gaitán scored a goal and later assisted the second goal in a win at Atlético Madrid (1–2) in the UEFA Champions League. On 9 December 2015, he signed an improved contract through June 2019, increasing his release clause to €45 million. On 9 March, Gaitán scored his fourth goal of the season in the Champions League, against Zenit Saint Petersburg in the second leg of the round of 16, helping Benfica to reach the quarter-finals of the competition with a 3–1 aggregate score, after a 2–1 win in Russia. On 15 May, he scored twice in a 4–1 home win against Nacional, helping Benfica to secure the league title for the third consecutive season. Five days later, he scored Benfica's fourth goal in a 6–2 win over Marítimo in the Taça da Liga final. A minute later, he was substituted and received a standing ovation while leaving the pitch in tears. After the final whistle, he said it was probably his last match with Benfica.

Atlético Madrid
On 16 June 2016, Benfica and Atlético Madrid agreed on the transfer of Gaitán for €25 million, with the contract to be signed after medical exams in July. His official presentation for the Spanish side was held on 19 July at the Vicente Calderón stadium.

Dalian Yifang
On 26 February 2018, along with teammate Yannick Carrasco, Gaitán joined Chinese Super League newcomers Dalian Yifang, which was also hold by Atlético Madrid's partial owner Wanda Group. On 3 March, he made his Chinese league debut in an 8–0 away loss to Shanghai SIPG. He temporarily lost consciousness and was taken to hospital following an elbowing from Li Lei during a league match against Beijing Guoan on 16 March 2018. On 7 April 2018, he scored his first goal in China as well as assisted Wang Jinxian's goal in a 2–2 home draw with Chongqing Dangdai Lifan.

Later career
On 14 March 2019, Gaitán signed for MLS side Chicago Fire on a free transfer for one season, with a club option until 2020.

On 31 January 2020, Gaitán joined Lille in France on a six-month contract until the end of the season. Gaitán left the Lille in June, having played only four games before the season was suspended due to the coronavirus pandemic.

On 11 August 2020, Gaitán signed for Portuguese club Braga on a one-year deal with an option for a further year, that season they won the Taça de Portugal.

After his one-year contract with Braga ended he signed for Uruguayan side Peñarol where he joined former teammate and friend Maxi Pereira, at the end of 2021 they celebrated winning the league.

On 31 January 2022, after already reaching an agreement with his previous club to end their contract, Paços de Ferreira and Gaitán reached a deal for a six-month contract with an option for a further year, Paços is the third portuguese club Gaitán as represented.

International career
Gaitán made his international debut for Argentina on 13 October 2009, as a substitute in a 2–0 friendly win over Ghana, and he made his first start in a 3–2 success against Costa Rica on 26 January of the following year. During Sergio Batista term, he made three appearances, playing against Costa Rica, Nigeria and Poland. With Sabella, Gaitán did not make an appearance but with the appointment of Gerardo Martino, he returned after a two-year absence, playing the final minutes, after replacing Sergio Agüero on 3 September 2014 in an away win against Germany.

Style of play
Gaitán began playing as a midfielder, sometimes leaning to the left. After moving to Benfica he assumed a more advanced role, where he seemed more comfortable.

A left-footer who is also able to play on the right, with good dribbling skills and close control, Gaitán's main asset is ball distribution as he is able to cross from either flank, and while on the right he possesses the vision to pick holes when cutting inside.

Career statistics

Club

International

International goals
Scores and results list Argentina's goal tally first.

Honours

Club
Boca Juniors
Argentine Primera División: 2008 Apertura

Benfica
Primeira Liga: 2013–14, 2014–15, 2015–16
Taça de Portugal: 2013–14
Taça da Liga: 2010–11, 2011–12, 2013–14, 2014–15, 2015–16
Supertaça Cândido de Oliveira: 2014
UEFA Europa League runner-up: 2012–13, 2013–14

Atlético Madrid
UEFA Europa League: 2017–18

Braga
Taça de Portugal: 2020–21

Peñarol
 Uruguayan Primera División: 2021

International
Argentina
Copa América: Runner-up 2016

Individual
Primeira Liga Breakthrough Player of the Year: 2010–11
UEFA Champions League top assist provider: 2011–12
UEFA Europa League Squad of the Season: 2013–14
Cosme Damião Awards – Footballer of the Year: 2014
2016 Taça da Liga Final: Man of the Match

Notes

References

External links

 Chicago Fire official profile
 Stats at Historia de Boca  
 
 
 

1988 births
Living people
People from San Martín, Buenos Aires
Argentine footballers
Argentina international footballers
Association football wingers
Argentine Primera División players
Boca Juniors footballers
Primeira Liga players
La Liga players
Chinese Super League players
Major League Soccer players
Ligue 1 players
Uruguayan Primera División players
S.L. Benfica footballers
Atlético Madrid footballers
Dalian Professional F.C. players
Chicago Fire FC players
Lille OSC players
S.C. Braga players
Peñarol players
F.C. Paços de Ferreira players
Argentine expatriate footballers
Expatriate footballers in Portugal
Expatriate footballers in Spain
Expatriate footballers in China
Expatriate soccer players in the United States
Expatriate footballers in France
Expatriate footballers in Uruguay
Argentine expatriate sportspeople in Portugal
Argentine expatriate sportspeople in Spain
Argentine expatriate sportspeople in China
Argentine expatriate sportspeople in the United States
Argentine expatriate sportspeople in France
Argentine expatriate sportspeople in Uruguay
Copa América Centenario players
Sportspeople from Buenos Aires Province